Benicio  is both a given name, cognate to Benedict (given name), and a surname. Notable people with the name include:

 Benicio del Toro (born 1967), Puerto Rican actor and producer
 Murilo Benício (born 1972), Brazilian actor

See also
 Philip Benizi de Damiani, also known as Felipe Benicio